The Al-Tammuz missile was an Iraqi project to design a surface-to-surface missile (SSM) based on scud technology that could deliver a payload of at least 1,000 kg to a distance of 1,200 km. The missile was a potential delivery system that could have helped Iraq to deliver nuclear payloads.

History
Iraq had been planning to produce a liquid propelled surface-to-surface missile having a range of 1,200-2,000 km based on current scud technology. The Iraqis had started Project 144 for the production and modification of missile systems and designated it to the Al Qaya state establishment. The Iraqis also assigned project 1729 to Nassr State Enterprise, Research and Development Center, Taji-Baghdad. The Iraqis also started Project 1728 for indigenous scud engine development and production. Practical work on this missile, however, did not start until April 1989, according to Iraqi suggestions the nuclear capable version  would not have been ready by 1993, two years after the first Iraqi nuclear weapon was to be produced.

The Al-Tammuz missile program received help from foreign expertise especially from the Brazilian scientist Major General Hugo de Oliveira Piva.

Characteristics
The missile was to be liquid propelled with a range of 1,200-2,000 km and a payload capacity of at least one ton. The engine was to be based on the Second stage of Al-Abid LV. Note that some sources also designate the al-Abid LV as Tammuz-2.

See also
Al-Hussein (missile)
Badr-2000

References 

Military history of Iraq
Medium-range ballistic missiles of Iraq
Surface-to-surface missiles of Iraq
Scud missiles